United Nations Security Council Resolution 31, adopted on August 25, 1947, offered to assist in the peaceful resolution of the Indonesian National Revolution by setting up a committee of three members; one to be chosen by the Netherlands, one to be chosen by Indonesia and the third to be chosen by the other two members of the committee.

The resolution passed eight votes to none, with abstentions from Poland, Syria and the Soviet Union.

See also
List of United Nations Security Council Resolutions 1 to 100 (1946–1953)
United Nations Security Council Resolution 27
United Nations Security Council Resolution 30

References
Text of the Resolution at undocs.org

External links
 

 0031
Indonesian National Revolution
 0031
 0031
1947 in Indonesia
August 1947 events